A dragon is a shortened version of blunderbuss, a firearm with a short, large caliber barrel which is flared at the muzzle and frequently throughout the entire bore. Dragons were typically issued to dragoon cavalry, who needed a lightweight, easily handled firearm while mounted.

Etymology 
The term dragon is taken from the fact that early versions were decorated with a carving in the form of a mythical dragon's head around the muzzle; the muzzle blast would then give the impression of a fire-breathing dragon.

History and description 
Early dragons were short wheellock firearms. It is called a dragon because the muzzle is decorated with a dragon's head. The practice comes from a time when all gunpowder weapons had distinctive names, including the culverin, serpentine, falcon, and falconet. The dragon was effective only at short range, lacking accuracy at long range.

In Indonesia, the weapon is called a tarkul, where it was one of the most well-known weapons among sailors, merchants and pirates of the archipelago. Tarkul initially used wheel-lock mechanisms. Tarkuls were used in the wars between kingdoms, by sultans in the Philippines against Spain, by the Brunei army against King Brooke, and in the Naning War of 1831 in Malacca. Around 1530, the tarkul advanced with the use of flintlock technology and since then has been more recognized as a pistol in the West.

See also 
 Pistol
 Shotgun

References

Further reading 
 

Early firearms
18th-century weapons
19th-century weapons
Weapons of the Netherlands